The Gunfight at Hide Park, or Newton Massacre, was the name given to an Old West gunfight that occurred on August 19, 1871, in Newton, Kansas, United States. It was well publicized at the time, but since has received little historical attention, despite it producing a higher body count than the Gunfight at the O.K. Corral and the Four Dead in Five Seconds Gunfight of 1881.  Unlike most other well-known gunfights of the Old West, it involved no notable or well known gunfighters, nor did it propel any of its participants into any degree of fame. Its legend has grown, however, because one of the participants simply walked away from the scene, never to be seen again.

The gunfight
The incident began with an argument between two local lawmen, Billy Bailey and Mike McCluskie. The two men began arguing on August 11, 1871, over local politics on election day in the "Red Front Saloon", located in downtown Newton. The argument developed into a fist fight, with Bailey being knocked outside the saloon and into the street. McCluskie followed, drawing his pistol. He fired two shots at Bailey, hitting him with the second shot in the chest. Bailey died the next day, on August 12, 1871. McCluskie fled town to avoid arrest, but was only away for a few days before returning, after receiving information that the shooting would most likely be deemed self defense, despite the fact that Bailey never produced a weapon. McCluskie had claimed he feared for his life, having known that in three previous gunfights, Bailey had killed two men.

Bailey, a native of Texas, had several cowboy friends who were in town. Upon hearing of his death, they vowed revenge against McCluskie. On August 19, 1871, McCluskie entered Newton and went to gamble at "Tuttles Dance Hall", located in an area of town called Hide Park. He was accompanied by a friend, Jim Martin. As McCluskie settled into gambling, three cowboys entered the saloon. They were Billy Garrett, Henry Kearnes, and Jim Wilkerson, all friends of Bailey. Billy Garrett had been in at least two prior gunfights, killing two men.

Hugh Anderson, the son of a wealthy Bell County, Texas cattle rancher, also entered, and approached McCluskie, calling him a coward and threatening his life. Jim Martin jumped up in an attempt to stop a fight from occurring.

Anderson shot McCluskie in the neck, knocking him to the floor.  McCluskie attempted to shoot Anderson, but his pistol misfired.  Anderson then stood over him and shot him several times in the back.

Kearns, Garrett, and Wilkerson also began firing, perhaps to keep the crowd back, and may have shot McCluskie in the leg. At that point a young man, believed to have been around 18 years of age at the time, named James Riley, opened fire on them.

Riley was dying from tuberculosis, and had been taken in by McCluskie shortly after arriving in Newton. Riley had never been involved in a gunfight before, but only Anderson still had a loaded pistol to return fire. Some accounts say Riley locked the saloon doors before shooting, but there is no evidence of such action. The room was filled with smoke from all the prior gunfire, and visibility was bad.  Riley ended up hitting seven men.

Jim Martin, the would-be peacemaker, was shot in the neck and later died of his wound. Garrett, Kearns, and a bystander named Patrick Lee were also mortally wounded. Anderson, Wilkerson, and another bystander were wounded but survived.

With both guns empty and all his opponents down, Riley walked away and was never seen again. Legend has it he left the area and began a new life elsewhere. However, due to his ill physical state, it is more likely he died not long afterward under an assumed name. Either way, he disappeared.

A warrant was issued for Anderson for killing McCluskie. He left Kansas cause he was bored by training and settling in Texas to recover from his gunshots. He was later confronted by Mike McCluskie's brother Arthur, who challenged him to a duel in revenge for his brother's death. The duel ended with both severely injured, Arthur McCluskie fatally.

In Media
This story inspired the western short film, No Sunday West Of Newton, written by Gwendolyn Cameron, Hunter Gehman, and Spencer Cameron.

This story also inspired the 2019 album The Cowboy Iliad: A Legend Told in the Spoken Word written by Walter Hill and produced by Bobby Woods.

References

External links
 Gunfight at Hide Park
 Where did Hide Park go?  - The Kansan

Conflicts in 1871
American Old West gunfights
1871 in Kansas
August 1871 events